Gwisin are a type of spirit or ghost in Korean folklore. They are considered similar to a Yogoe;, and Mamul; they are people who have died, not monsters or creatures such as Dokkaebi. 

According to the folklore, Gwisin may be found in many places. It is claimed that when an individual dies but still has ties to the world of the living, such as in the case of revenge or caring for a loved one, their spirit remains on earth to complete the task before going on to the underworld.

Legends 
There are a lot of legends about Gwisin. Because they are a common form of ghost, children often make them up to scare others or parents tell stories to their children to teach them a lesson. Most legends are about revenge, revenge for their families or about men who cheated on their wives, or murdered the victim.

Appearances of Gwisin often occur in high schools, a concept popularized with the release of Whispering Corridors, a Korean horror movie released in 1998.

Physical characteristics 
Folklore says that the Gwisin ghosts are usually transparent, legless and float in mid-air. Female Gwisin or known as Cheonyeogwisin usually have white Hanbok (한복) which are worn for funerals. They have long, drooping black hair and sometimes they are faceless, depending on their personality. Male Gwisin are somewhat rare, and may appear different.

See also 
 Korean Virgin Ghost
 White Lady
 Oh My Ghost (TV series)
 Hotel del Luna (TV series)

References

External links 
 World of Human and Gwisin, Korea Creative Content Agency 

Korean legendary creatures
Female legendary creatures 
Korean ghosts